Madeline Fontaine is a French costume designer.

Biography 
Madeline Fontaine is president of the French Association of Film and Audiovisual costumers (AFCCA).

Filmography 
 Costume designer:
 1996 One Saturday on Earth of Diane Bertrand
 1997 The Target of Pierre Courrège
 1997 Violetta Queen of the bike of Guy Jacques
 1998 Let there be light of Arthur Joffé
 1999 Babel of Gérard Pullicino
 1999 Kennedy and me of Sam Karmann
 2001 Amélie of Jean-Pierre Jeunet
 2002: 20, avenue Parmentier of Christophe Jeauffroy
 2002 Almost Peaceful of Michel Deville
 2003:  The Belly of Juliette of Martin Provost
 2003 Let your hands on my hips of Chantal Lauby
 2004 A Very Long Engagement of Jean-Pierre Jeunet
 2005 A strings attached of Michel Deville
 2008 Asterix at the Olympic Games of Frédéric Forestier and Thomas Langmann
 2008 Cash of Eric Besnard
 2008 Séraphine of Martin Provost
 2008 Night Train of Jean-Pierre Jeunet Short / Pub Chanel No. 5
 2009 Micmacs of Jean-Pierre Jeunet
 2011 Chicken with Plums of Satrapi and Vincent Paronnaud
 2011:  The Hawk  (TV) of Stéphane keyboard
 2012 the Papas The Sunday of Louis Becker
 2012 My Heroes of Eric Besnard
 2012:  Déjà Vu  (Short / Pub) of Wong Kar-wai
 2012 Camille Rewinds of Noémie Lvovsky
 2013 The trip Extravagant young and prodigious TS Spivet of Jean-Pierre Jeunet
 2013 Violette Leduc of Martin Provost
 2013: Yves Saint-Laurent of Lespert
 2015 Versailles, television series
 Costume assistant:
 1983 The Summer murderer of Jean Becker
 1984 The Sailor 512 of René Allio
 1986 Jean de Florette of Berri
 1986 Manon des Sources of Berri
 1991 Snow and Fire of Claude Pinoteau
 1994 Prince of Jutland of Gabriel Axel
 1995 The City of Lost Children of Jean-Pierre Jeunet and Marc Caro

Awards and nominations

References

External links 
 
 Madeline Fontaine on the site of the AFCCA French Association of Film and Audiovisual costumers

Living people
Best Costume Design BAFTA Award winners
French costume designers
Women costume designers
Year of birth missing (living people)